William Blund was Archdeacon of Leicester from 1226 to 1229: he was also Chancellor and Precentor of Lincoln Cathedral.

Notes

See also
 Diocese of Lincoln
 Diocese of Peterborough
 Diocese of Leicester
 Archdeacon of Leicester

Archdeacons of Leicester
Lincoln Cathedral
13th-century English people